Robert Mylne may refer to:

 Robert Mylne (mason) (1633–1710), Scottish master-mason
 Robert Mylne (architect) (1733–1811), Scottish architect and engineer, great-grandson of the mason
 Robert Mylne (writer) (1643–1747), Scottish writer, engraver and antiquary
 Robert William Mylne (1817–1890), English architect, civil engineer and geologist
 Robert Scott Mylne (1854–1920), antiquarian, son of Robert William Mylne

See also
 Robert Milne (disambiguation)